FC Nove Zhyttya Andriivka is an amateur Ukrainian football club from Andriyivka, Mashivka Raion, Poltava Oblast. The head coach of the senior team is Oleksandr Melaschenko.

The club was founded in 2008 as a representation of a farming company "Nove Zhyttya". In 2010 the team joined Oleksandr Melaschenko along with brothers of Ruslan Rotan, Oleksiy and Petro.

In 2011 Nove Zhyttya Andriyivka won the Amateur Championship of Ukraine. The club participated in the 2013 UEFA Regions' Cup.

The club only played two seasons at the national amateur competitions.

Europe competitions

References

External links
 Nove Zhyttya
 Meet: the opponent of FC Putrivka (Знайомтеся: конкурент ФК «Путрівка»). Kiev Oblast Football Federation. 5 October 2011

Football clubs in Poltava Oblast
Amateur football clubs in Ukraine